R342 road may refer to:
 R342 road (Ireland)
 R342 road (South Africa)